Franck Manga "Did'dy" Guela (born 19 June 1986) is an Ivorian footballer who plays as a midfielder.

Career
Guela was born in Abidjan. After graduating from the Jean-Marc Guillou's Académie de Sol Beni, his agent, Eleftherios Sidiropoulos, brought him to one of his European teams, Dinamo Zagreb. A highlight of his career was the goal he scored for Kerkyra FC against Panathinaikos during the 2006–07 Super League Greece, helping his team to a 3–1 victory.

On 22 May 2007, Guela joined the Croatian champion, Dinamo Zagreb. He left on 18 August 2008 and joined on 4 October 2008 Athlitiki Enosi Larissa F.C. as an associate. He earned the right to play in official matches as of 26 November 2008.

After one year, Guela left the club to sign on 31 August 2009 for Arminia Bielefeld. He made his debut goal at home against Greuther Fürth, which turned out to be the winning goal.

References

External links
 Frank Manga Guela profile at Nogometni Magazin 

1986 births
Living people
Footballers from Abidjan
Ivorian footballers
Ivory Coast international footballers
Association football midfielders
Mamelodi Sundowns F.C. players
Expatriate soccer players in South Africa
Anagennisi Karditsa F.C. players
A.O. Kerkyra players
Veria F.C. players
Athlitiki Enosi Larissa F.C. players
Apollon Smyrnis F.C. players
Al Urooba Club players
Al Hamriyah Club players
UAE First Division League players
Super League Greece players
Expatriate footballers in Greece
GNK Dinamo Zagreb players
Croatian Football League players
Expatriate footballers in Croatia
Arminia Bielefeld players
2. Bundesliga players
Expatriate footballers in Germany
PFC Ludogorets Razgrad players
First Professional Football League (Bulgaria) players
Expatriate footballers in Bulgaria